Theales is a botanical name at the rank of order.  Early classifications such as that of Dahlgren placed the Theales in the superorder Theiflorae (also called Theanae). The name was used by the Cronquist system for an order placed in subclass Dilleniidae, in the 1981 version of the system the circumscription was:

 order Theales
 family Ochnaceae
 family Sphaerosepalaceae
 family Dipterocarpaceae
 family Caryocaraceae
 family Theaceae
 family Actinidiaceae
 family Scytopetalaceae
 family Pentaphylacaceae
 family Tetrameristaceae
 family Pellicieraceae
 family Oncothecaceae
 family Marcgraviaceae
 family Quiinaceae
 family Elatinaceae
 family Paracryphiaceae
 family Medusagynaceae
 family Clusiaceae

In the APG II system (used here) the taxa involved are assigned to many different orders, among which are Ericales, Malvales, and Malpighiales.

External links 
 L. Watson and M.J. Dallwitz (1992 onwards). The families of flowering plants: descriptions, illustrations, identification, information retrieval. http://delta-intkey.com

Historically recognized angiosperm orders